Eupithecia nirvana is a moth in the family Geometridae. It is endemic to China (Sichuan).

The forewings are brownish grey and the hindwings are the same colour, except for a lighter area near the costal margin.

References

External links

Moths described in 2006
Endemic fauna of Sichuan
Moths of Asia
nirvana